In Swedish folklore, the Storsjöodjuret (literally "The Great-Lake Monster") is a lake monster said to live in the  lake Storsjön in Jämtland in the middle of Sweden. 

The lake monster is first attested in a 1635 manuscript, according to which the sea/lake serpent (sjöorm) was bound up magically in the lake's depths by Kettil Runske who carved his spell into the Frösö Runestone (Frösö being an island in this lake). Later folk legends circulating locally in Jämtland claimed the monster was a product of tinkering by two trolls, and that it was a cat-headed creature with a black serpentine body.

There have been numerous eyewitness accounts since the 19th century, giving varying details, some claiming a dog-like head.

Name 

The monster is popularly referred to as Storsjöodjuret (the noun Storsjöodjur was first used in 1899) where odjur is a Swedish word for ‘monster’ or ‘large vermin’, literally ‘unanimal’. While Storsjö is the name of a lake (or lakes), storsjö can also be a common noun meaning ‘great-lake’, being the compound of Swedish stor (‘big’ or ‘great’) and sjö (‘lake’) . 

Sometimes it is simply called Storsjödjuret (‘The great-lake animal’).

In the English language Storsjöodjuret is sometimes called Storsie, similarly to Nessie, though the names Storsjö Monster, Storsjoe Monster or "the monster of Lake Storsjön", etc., and the literal translation The Great Lake Monster are used. Its Latin name is Hydogiganta Monstruidae Jemtlandicum.  It has also been called Storsjöormen (‘The Great Lake Serpent’).

Legends 

17th century attestations
The earliest description is of a sea/lake-serpent inhabiting Storsjön, contained in a manuscript by Morten Pedersen Herdal dated to 1635. According to commentators this text ascribed to rune-master Kettil Runske the feat of binding this serpent to the bottom of the lake by carving a magic spell into the Frösö Runestone (erected on Frösö, an island in this lake).

"It is said that beneath this [rune]stone lies a dreadfully large head of a serpent and that the body stretches over Storsjön to  village and Hille Sand where the tail is buried. The serpent was called a rå and therefore shall this stone be risen. Since no one peacefully could cross [Storsjön], the ferryman and his wife states, along with many others, that in the last turbulent time this stone was tore down and broken in two. As long as this stone laid on the ground many strange things occurred in the water, until the stone was risen and assembled anew".

The Frösö stone has a large serpent depicted on it, but there is no reference about it nor "Kettil Runske (Ketil Runske)" in the text itself, which instead tells about Austmaðr, Guðfastr's son's christening of Jämtland, and with the construction of the Frösö Bridge. Though it has indeed been broken in two pieces.

Folktale
The folk-legend that circulated around the Jämtland region provided additional details. According to this lore, "A long, long time ago", two trolls named Jata and Kata were on Storsjön's shore, each one brewing his cauldron at the lake for "days, weeks and months", until at last was heard "a groaning sound as if from a sick child" followed by a "loud bang.. as if by a violent thunderclap", and out of one cauldron leaped out a strange creature with a black serpent-like body and a cat-like head, which disappeared into  the lake (the trolls and the cauldrons too vanished as well, in a wisp of white smoke, leaving a gaping abyss). The monster dwelling in the lake became a menace to surrounding areas, and grew so big as to encircle the entire island of Frösön and be able to bite its own tail. Then came along Ketil Jamte who bound the beast by carving spells into a stone which was erected on the east shore of Frösön. Parts of the beast were still visible above the water-line, but it is warned that it could be liberated some day when someone deciphers the runestone.

The name of the hero may be Ketil Jamte or Ketil Ruske depending on the version. According to one informant, the rune-master was named Gudfast, which thus makes connection with the legendary Austmann Gudfastsson (aforementioned, inscribed on the runestone).

Eyewitness accounts 

There have been hundreds of recorded sightings of Storsjöodjuret dating back to the 19th century. Newspapers reported in July 1857 that workers at the Forssbacka bruk (iron mill) on the lake spotted from far away a creature with a head "black and gleaming", about the size of a large cat's head, with the water movement suggesting it was a sort of sea-serpent.

Peter Olsson published an 1899 booklet, documenting 22 eyewitness testimonies, and collated the details in his summary. Olsson, a naturalist, concluded that the most likely match was some aquatic mammal that had yet to be identified.

It had a snake-like body, long neck, with some giving the description of a dog-like head, thus making it an eared creature, unlike most serpents, though some accounts describing as finned is ambiguous as to fins or ears. Some said it had several humps on its back, but Olsson lumped these cases together with "vertical" curvings or undulations.

Capture campaign 
Common interest in the creature was sparked first in the 1890s. After several sightings, an enterprise of locals was founded to catch the monster in 1894, even obtaining the sponsorship of King Oscar II. The failed attempt was featured in a satirical cartoon by Albert Engström in the  magazine.

Film footage 

In August 2008, a film crew claimed to have captured Storsjöodjuret on film, reporting that infrared cameras showed an endothermic mass in the lake.

Protected status 
The only city located by Storsjön, Östersund, celebrated its 200-year anniversary in 1986. That year, the Jämtland county administrative board declared Storsjöodjuret to be an endangered species, and Storsjöodjuret along with its offspring and nest became protected by law. The law was revoked in 2005, with the Parliamentary Ombudsman (JO/Justitieombudsmannen) spearheading the criticism.

Explanatory notes

Citations 
Notes

Bibliography

 

 

 

 . PDF via

External links
Official page of Storsjöodjuret In Swedish, English, German
Great Lake Monster Website
"Storsie – 1857 report discovered", Trinkelbonker
 Storsjöodjurets observationsdatabas - query specifying location ("Frösö"), etc. returns dataset of alleged sightings, the website also holds numerous digicopies of newspaper articles.

Scandinavian legendary creatures
Jämtland County
Swedish legends
Water monsters